The Futureheads are an English four-piece post-punk revival band. They have released four studio albums and twelve singles, five of which have entered the UK Singles Chart.

Studio albums

EPs
 Nul Book Standard EP (2002) Project Cosmonaut
 1-2-3-Nul! EP (2003) Fantastic Plastic Records - UK #17
 Area EP (2005) 679 Recordings - UK #18

Singles

Notes

Free downloads
 "A To B" (2004)
 "Broke Up The Time" (November 2007 - released as an album three preview)
 "Crash" (December 2007 - released a mailing list only Christmas exclusive. Was recorded during TINTW sessions.)
 "Struck Dumb" (November 2009)
 "Heartbeat Song" (A Capella) (14 February 2012)

Compilations
Music from the OC: Mix 4 (2005 • Warner Bros./Wea)
'' Grandma's Boy Original Soundtrack with the song "Meantime".

References

Discography
Discographies of British artists
Rock music group discographies